"Rude Removal" (also known as Dexter's Rude Removal) is a cartoon segment originally produced for the animated television series Dexter's Laboratory for Cartoon Network. It was intended to air as part of an episode from the second season, but was banned and rejected due to the characters swearing even though the swear words were censored. In the segment, Dexter and Dee Dee are accidentally split into two pairs, a polite pair and a rude pair, with the latter depicted as using profanity with bleep censorship. The segment was only screened at some animation festivals before finally being released online by Adult Swim on January 22, 2013.

Plot 
Dexter invents the Rude Removal System, a machine to remove the rudeness from his sister Dee Dee. However, Dee Dee thinks Dexter is the one who is rude. They start fighting and both wind up in the machine. Inadvertently, the Rude Removal System is activated, splitting the pair into well-behaved and rude halves, with the well behaved duplicates speaking with English accents, and the rude duplicates speaking with New York City accents while using profanity. The rude pair harbors destructive tendencies by insulting their mother and destroying the house and Dexter's lab. Dexter and Dee Dee trick their rude halves back into the Rude Removal System and reverse the process, combining the rude and polite halves and resolving the problem. The segment ends with Dexter and Dee Dee's mother holding a bar of soap, poised to wash the filthy words from their mouths before it cuts to black.

Production 
The "Rude Removal" segment was produced during the second season of Dexter's Laboratory in 1997, and features a seven-minute runtime. It was directed by Rob Renzetti and storyboarded by Chong Lee and Craig McCracken, the latter of whom did confirm that he never had a copy, and neither did creator Genndy Tartakovsky. Main cast member Jeff Bennett did not participate in a voice role throughout this segment. The segment was never broadcast on television. Series creator Genndy Tartakovsky commented that "standards didn't like it". Linda Simensky, then-vice president of original programming for Cartoon Network, said "I still think it's very funny. It probably would air better late at night." After being asked about it on his Tumblr page, Calvin Wong, writer and storyboard artist for Regular Show, said that Cartoon Network denied that it was in their media library. The title card depicted Dee Dee flipping viewers the bird, and Dexter mooning at the audience.

Screenings and release 
Despite never airing on television, "Rude Removal" did see limited showing at certain animation festivals and conventions, including an event at the 1998 World Animation Celebration on February 21, 1998. Tartakovsky would sometimes show the cartoon when he spoke in public. One such showing occurred during a lecture given at the Rhode Island School of Design on November 15, 2008. He was asked about the segment during a Reddit AMA in October 2012, and he replied "Next time I do a public appearance, I'll bring it with me!". Adult Swim later asked fans on Twitter if there was still any interest in the segment, and the response was "overwhelming".

The segment was finally uploaded to YouTube and Adult Swim's official website on January 22, 2013. The released segment is censored. The video has been made private, but re-uploads can be found. An uncensored version is known to exist.

Reception 
In his review of "Rude Removal", Erik Adams of The A.V. Club opined that the segment was "nowhere near as crass" as anticipated. He concluded that "if Cartoon Network would've aired 'Rude Removal' with all its bleeps intact, we would've never learned how to use such filthy language."

References

External links 
 
 

1998 American television episodes
Censorship in the United States
Dexter's Laboratory
Animated television episodes
Television episodes about cloning
Television episodes about profanity
Television controversies in the United States
Television episodes pulled from general rotation
Unaired television episodes
Animation controversies in television
Obscenity controversies in television
Obscenity controversies in animation